The Egypt national football team, known colloquially as "the Pharaohs", represents Egypt in men's international football, and is governed by the Egyptian Football Association (EFA), the governing body of football in Egypt. The team's historical stadium is Cairo International Stadium, although matches are sometimes played at Borg El Arab Stadium in Alexandria.

Egypt has won the African Cup a record seven times. In the international stage, Egypt has made three appearances in the World Cup and was the first African and Arab team to make an appearance. They also hold the record for the oldest player to have played at the World Cup.

History

The first Egyptian national football team was constituted in 1920, the first African football team created to compete in the Summer Olympics in Belgium. The opening match of their campaign was a loss against the Italians. Between 1958 and 1961, the country had a political unity with Syria and went under the name of United Arab Republic, though the Egyptian team's records are attributed to Egypt only by FIFA as it was represented by Egyptian footballers and the team played in the Africa Cup of Nations. The Pharaohs had appeared in three FIFA World Cups and they are the most successful team in the Africa Cup of Nations, winning the competition seven times, with the 2010 Africa Cup of Nations being the most recent one.

Africa Cup of Nations
Egypt first participated in the first Africa Cup of Nations tournament in 1957. In their first game, a semi-final, they faced Sudan, winning 2–1; Egypt won 4–0 in the final.

In their second participation in the Africa Cup of Nations in 1959, Egypt became champions again. There were only three teams in that tournament, Ethiopia, Sudan, and Egypt, who were undefeated. They lost their first final in the Africa Cup of Nations in 1962.

Their fourth appearance came in 1963 in Ghana. Egypt was placed in Group B with Sudan and Nigeria, defeating Nigeria 6–3, but drawing 2–2 against Sudan. Despite being undefeated in the group stage, they were ranked second, behind Sudan by goal difference. Egypt, as runners-up in Group B, participated in the 3rd place match, playing against Ethiopia, winning 3–0.

For the 1965 Africa Cup of Nations, Egypt qualified for the tournament, but withdrew because of their diplomatic relationship with hosts Tunisia. They also withdrew in 1968.

In the 1970 Africa Cup of Nations, hosted again in Sudan, Egypt were in Group B along with Ghana, Guinea, and the Democratic Republic of the Congo, known as Congo-Kinshasa back then. In their opening match, Egypt defeated Guinea by a score of 4–1 and drew Ghana 1–1, defeating Congo-Kinshasa 1–0. Egypt ended being in first place, thus advancing to the next round, where they faced Sudan. Egypt eventually lost their first game in the Africa Cup of Nations by a scored of 2–1, then in the third place match, won against Ivory Coast 3–1.

Egypt failed to qualify for the first time in 1972 after being eliminated by Morocco by an aggregate score of 5–3. However, Egypt returned for 1974, hosting the event. They finished third place. Two years later, in Ethiopia, they were in Group A with the hosts, Guinea, and Uganda. Egypt defeated Uganda 2–1, but drew against Uganda and Ethiopia. Egypt advanced to the final round, and lost all matches. This is the first Africa Cup of Nations tournament that Egypt lost 3 consecutive games. Egypt then failed to qualify for 1978.

Egypt reappeared for the 1980 African Cup of Nations, defeating Ivory Coast and defeated Tanzania, but lost to hosts Nigeria 1–0. Egypt progressed to the semi-finals to face Algeria, who defeated the Egyptians on penalties. For the Four years later, Egypt defeated Cameroon and Ivory Coast, and drew Togo, eventually finishing fourth behind Algeria.

For 1986, Egypt hosted; they lost to Senegal 1–0. However, Egypt went on to win their two remaining games in the group stage, 2–0 against the Ivory Coast and Mozambique. Egypt advanced to the final for the first time since 1962, eventually winning. Egypt qualified for 1990, losing all group stage matches, thus making Egypt fail to obtain at least one point for the first time in the Africa Cup of Nations. They repeated this in 1992.

In the 1994 Africa Cup of Nations in Tunisia, Egypt defeated Gabon 4–0 and tied Nigeria 0–0. They lost to Mali 1–0 in the quarterfinals. Egypt won their fourth title in 1998, defeating South Africa in the final.

Egypt qualified for the 2004 Africa Cup of Nations, in Tunisia. Egypt were placed in Group C with Algeria, Zimbabwe, and Cameroon. Egypt won 2–1 against Zimbabwe, lost 2–1 to Algeria, and drew 0–0 against Cameroon, failing to qualify for the quarter-finals due to Algeria scoring more goals than Egypt in the group stage, after being equal on points and goal difference.

The 2006 Africa Cup of Nations was hosted in Egypt; the hosts were in Group A with Libya, Morocco, and the Ivory Coast. Egypt defeated Libya 3–0, tied 0–0 against Morocco, and won 3–1 against the Ivory Coast. Egypt would eventually win the tournament on penalties, and would also win the 2008 and 2010 tournaments.
They would then fail to qualify for the next three AFCON tournaments.

Egypt qualified for the 2017 tournament, drawing against Mali in their first match in Group D. Successive 1–0 wins against Uganda and Ghana saw the Pharaohs qualify to the quarter-finals as group winners. Egypt faced Morocco at the quarter-final stage, and defeated them for the first time in 31 years to set up a semi-final clash with Burkina Faso. Mohamed Salah's goal against the Stallions was canceled out by an Aristide Bancé strike; however, veteran goalkeeper Essam El Hadary saved two spot-kicks in the penalty shootout to earn a spot in the final for Egypt. Egypt then faced Cameroon, and lost the final for the second time.

In the 2019 Africa Cup of Nations, hosts Egypt were knocked out by South Africa in the round of 16, despite three wins in the group stage. In the 2021 Africa Cup, Egypt went to the final despite dire performances in the group stage and beating Ivory Coast on penalties after a 0–0 draw. Egypt then beat Cameroon 3–1 in penalties after a 0–0 draw, to reach their 10th final, beating Ghana's record of final appearances. Egypt suffered their first of two losses to Senegal in 2022, both on penalties (in the AFCON final and in World Cup qualifying), both winning penalties scored by Sadio Mané.

FIFA World Cup

Egypt has qualified for the FIFA World Cup three times: in 1934, in 1990 and for the 2018 editions. Egypt was the first African country to qualify for the World Cup, beating Mandatory Palestine. It lost to Hungary 4–2 in their first and only match in 1934.

In 1990, Egypt qualified after beating Algeria 1–0 in the playoffs. They were drawn in Group F, with Ireland, England and the Netherlands. Since the Egyptians favored defensive tactics, they scored only one goal in the 1990 World Cup. A 1–1 draw with UEFA Euro 1988 champions Netherlands gave the Egyptians their first point in the World Cup. This was followed by a draw against Ireland and a 1–0 loss to England.

On 8 October 2017, Egypt qualified for the 2018 World Cup after a 2–1 win over Congo.

In the 2018 World Cup, Egypt was drawn with Saudi Arabia, Uruguay and the hosts, Russia. They started their first game against Uruguay, without Salah, who was injured in the UEFA Champions League final. Despite this, they lost 1–0, and goalkeeper Mohamed El Shenawy was voted man of the match. He refused the reward due to sponsorship by Budweiser.

Salah returned to the starting lineup when Egypt faced Russia. Russia led 3–0, and then Salah scored Egypt's first World Cup goal in 28 years.

Egypt's third and final match was a Red Sea Derby against Saudi Arabia, also out of contention after two losses. Essam El Hadary became the oldest player in the World Cup at 45 years and 161 days.

Héctor Cúper, who was criticised due to his defensive strategies against Saudi Arabia, was sacked. The Egyptian Football Association was also criticised due to having its base in Chechnya, far from where Egypt's matches were played. The Egyptian media and the public heavily criticized EFA's management of the team.

Home stadium 

Egypt's home games are early years were played at Cairo International Stadium since 1960, during renovations they play at Borg El Arab Stadium

Kits and crests 

The Egypt national football team's traditional home kit is red, away is white, and third is green.

Kit suppliers

Results and fixtures

Matches played in last 12 months, as well as any future scheduled matches.

2021

2022

2023

Coaching staff

Coaching history

 Hussein Hegazi (1920–24)
 James McCrae (1934–36)
 Tewfik Abdullah (1940–44)
 Eric Keen (1947–48)
 Edward Jones (1949–52)
 National Committee1 (1953–54)
 Ljubiša Broćić (1954–55)
 Mourad Fahmy (1955–57)
 Mohamed El-Guindi & Hanafy Bastan (1958, 1962)
 Pál Titkos (1959–61)
 Fouad Ahmed Sedki (1963)
 Branko Horvatek (1963–64)
 Andrija Pflander (1964–65)
 Dimitri Tadić (1965)
 Andrija Kovač (1965)
 Sándor Kapocsi (1965–67)
 Saleh El Wahsh & Kamal El Sabagh (1968–70)
 Dettmar Cramer (1971–74)
 Burkhard Pape (1975–77)
 Dušan Nenković (1977–78)
 Taha Ismail (1978)
 Bundzsák Dezso (1979)
 Fouad Ahmed Sedki (1980)
 Abdel Monem El Hajj (1980)
 Hamada El Sharqawy (1980)
 Karl-Heinz Heddergott (1982–84)
 Saleh El Wahsh (1984)
 Mike Smith (1985–88)
 Mahmoud El Gohary (1988–90, 1992, 1997–99, 2000–02)
 Dietrich Weise (1990–91)
 Mahmoud Saad (1992)
 Mohamed Shehta (1993)
 Mircea Rădulescu (1993–94)
 Taha Ismail (1994)
 Nol de Ruiter (1994–95)
 Mohsen Saleh (1995, 2002–04)
 Ruud Krol (1996)
 Farouk Gaafar (1996–1997)
 Gerard Gili (1999–00)
 Marco Tardelli (2004–05)
 Hassan Shehata (2004–11)
 Bob Bradley (2011–13)
 Shawky Gharieb (2013–14)
 Héctor Cúper (2015–18)
 Javier Aguirre (2018–19)
 Hossam El Badry (2019–21)
 Carlos Queiroz (2021–22)
 Ehab Galal (2022)
 Rui Vitória (2022–)

Note: 1 A committee of six former Egypt internationals.

Players

Current squad
 The following players were called up for the 2023 Africa Cup of Nations qualification matches.
 Match dates: 24 and 28 March 2023
 Opposition: 
 Caps and goals correct as of: 18 November 2022, after the match against .

Recent call-ups
The following players have been called up for the team in the last 12 months.

INJ Player withdrew from the squad due to an injury.
PRE Preliminary squad / standby.
RET Retired from the national team.
SUS Player suspended from the squad for disciplinary reasons.
WD Player withdrew from the squad for non-injury related reasons.

Records

Players in bold are still active with Egypt.

Most appearances

Top goalscorers

Team records
In 2017, Egypt set a new record of 24 consecutive Africa Cup of Nations matches played without defeat, dating back to their last tournament appearance in 2010. During this run, Egypt also reached a record nine consecutive wins in AFCON matches after beating Ghana in the 2010 final, while becoming the first team to win three consecutive AFCON titles. The unbeaten run came to an end on 5 February 2017, after Egypt lost 1–2 to Cameroon in the 2017 final.

Competitive records

FIFA World Cup

Africa Cup of Nations

FIFA Confederations Cup
Egypt appeared in two of the ten FIFA Confederations Cups contested, being eliminated in the group stage on both occasions. Egypt's first Confederations Cup appearance was in 1999 as a result of winning the Africa Cup of Nations in 1998. The second appearance was in 2009 as the Africa Cup of Nations winners in 2008, where they won against Italy 1–0.

FIFA Arab Cup

Pan Arab Games

Olympic Games

Egypt withdrew from the 1956 Football tournament and boycotted the 1980 Olympics after qualifying for both.

African Games

 Prior to the Cairo 1991 campaign, the All-Africa Games was open to full senior national teams

Palestine Cup of Nations

All-time results

The following table shows Egypt's all-time international record, correct as of 27 September 2022.

Egypt - Historical results

Honours
African competitions
 Africa Cup of NationsWinners:  1957,  1959,  1986,  1998,  2006,  2008,  2010
Runners-up:  1962,  2017,  2021
Third place:  1963,  1970,  1974
Fourth place: 1976, 1980, 1984

 All-Africa GamesChampions:  1987,  1995
Third place:  1973

 Afro-Asian Cup of NationsRunners-up:  1988, 2007

Arab competitions
 Pan Arab GamesChampions:  1953,  1965,  1992*,  2007
Runners-up:  1961

 Arab CupChampions:  1992*
Third Place:  1988

 Palestine Cup of NationsChampions:  1972,  1975

Note: * The 1992 edition organised as part of the Pan Arab Games, and also counted as Arab Cup.

Other competitions
 Mediterranean Games
Champions:  1955
Silver Medalist:  1951
Bronze Medalist:  1983

 7th November CupRunners-up:  1993

 Nile Basin TournamentChampions:  2011

 LG Cup (association football)'''
Champions:  2005

See also
 Egyptian Football Association
 Egyptian Premier League
 Egypt Cup
 Egyptian Super Cup
 Egypt national under-23 football team
 Egypt national under-20 football team
 Egypt national under-17 football team
 List of football clubs in Egypt
 List of Egyptian football players in foreign leagues

Notes

Egypt is the only national team that won the Africa Cup Of Nations 3 times in a row.

References

External links

 Egyptian FA official site
 CAF profile
 FIFA profile
 RSSSF archive of coaches 1920–
 RSSSF archive of most capped players and highest goalscorers
 Egyptian Players
 Information on National team and club football in Egypt

 
1920 establishments in Egypt
African national association football teams
Football in Egypt
E
National sports teams established in 1920